|}

The Poule d'Essai des Pouliches is a Group 1 flat horse race in France open to three-year-old thoroughbred fillies. It is run over a distance of 1,600 metres (about 1 mile) at Longchamp in May. It is France's equivalent of the 1000 Guineas run in Britain.

History

Origins
The Poule d'Essai, an event for three-year-old colts and fillies, was established in France in 1840. It was inspired by two races in England, the 2000 Guineas (for colts and fillies) and the 1,000 Guineas (for fillies only).

The race was initially staged at the Champ de Mars. Its first running was over one full circuit of the track (about 2,000 metres). It was cut to a three-quarter lap (1,500 metres) in 1841. It was cancelled due to insufficient entries in 1843 and 1844.

The Poule d'Essai was transferred to Longchamp in 1857. It was extended to 1,600 metres in 1867. It was abandoned because of the Franco-Prussian War in 1871. It continued to be run until 1882.

Modern version
The modern Poule d'Essai des Pouliches was created in 1883, when the Poule d'Essai was divided into two separate races. The "Pouliches" was restricted to fillies, and the Poule d'Essai des Poulains was reserved for colts.

The events were cancelled throughout World War I, with no runnings from 1915 to 1918. There were two 1,800-metre replacement races at Chantilly in 1917. The version for fillies was called the Critérium d'Essai des Pouliches.

The "Pouliches" and "Poulains" were not run in the spring of 1940, but a substitute combining both races took place at Auteuil in October. Titled the Prix d'Essai, it was won by the colt Djebel.

The Poule d'Essai des Pouliches was held at Le Tremblay in 1943, and Maisons-Laffitte in 1944 and 1945.

The present race grading system was introduced in 1971, and the event was given Group 1 status. It was switched from Longchamp's middle course (moyenne piste) to the main course (grande piste) in 1987.

The leading horses from the Poule d'Essai des Pouliches sometimes go on to compete in the Prix de Diane. Twenty-six fillies have won both races. The most recent was Avenir Certain in 2014.

Records

Leading jockey (8 wins):
 Freddy Head – Ivanjica (1975), Riverqueen (1976), Dancing Maid (1978), Three Troikas (1979), Silvermine (1985), Miesque (1987), Matiara (1995), Always Loyal (1997)

Leading trainer (7 wins):
 Charles Semblat – Esmeralda (1942), Caravelle (1943), Palencia (1944), Corteira (1948), Coronation / Galgala (1949), Corejada (1950), Djelfa (1951)
 Criquette Head-Maarek – Three Troikas (1979), Silvermine (1985), Baiser Vole (1986), Ravinella (1988), Matiara (1995), Always Loyal (1997), Special Duty (2010)

Leading owner (8 wins):
 Marcel Boussac – Esmeralda (1942), Caravelle (1943), Palencia (1944), Corteira (1948), Coronation / Galgala (1949), Corejada (1950), Djelfa (1951), Apollonia (1956)

Winners since 1970

 Price Tag finished first in 2006, but she was relegated to third place following a stewards' inquiry.

 Liliside was first in 2010, but she was placed sixth after a stewards' inquiry.

 The 2016 and 2017 races took place at Deauville while Longchamp was closed for redevelopment.

 The 2020 running took place at Deauville on 1 June as Longchamp was closed owing to the COVID-19 pandemic.

Earlier winners

 1883: Stockholm
 1884: Yvrande
 1885: Barberine
 1886: Sakountala
 1887: Tenebreuse
 1888: Widgeon
 1889: May Pole
 1890: Wandora
 1891: Primrose
 1892: Kairouan
 1893: Tilly
 1894: Calceolaire
 1895: Andree
 1896: Riposte
 1897: Roxelane
 1898: Polymnie
 1899: Sesara
 1900: Semendria
 1901: La Camargo
 1902: Kizil Kourgan
 1903: Rose de Mai
 1904: Xylene
 1905: Princesse Lointaine
 1906: Sais
 1907: Madree
 1908: Sauge Pourpree
 1909: Ronde de Nuit
 1910: Vellica
 1911: Bolide
 1912: Porte Maillot
 1913: Banshee
 1914: Diavolezza
 1915–18: no race
 1919: Galejade
 1920: Flowershop
 1921: Nephthys
 1922: Frisky
 1923: Anna Bolena
 1924: Rebia
 1925: La Dame de Trefle
 1926: Mackwiller
 1927: Fairy Legend
 1928: Roahouga
 1929: Poesie
 1930: Rose The
 1931: Pearl Cap
 1932: Ligne de Fond
 1933: Bipearl
 1934: Mary Tudor
 1935: The Nile
 1936: Blue Bear
 1937: Colette Baudoche
 1938: Feerie
 1939: Yonne
 1940: no race
 1941: Longthanh
 1942: Esmeralda
 1943: Caravelle
 1944: Palencia
 1945: Nikellora
 1946: Real
 1947: Imprudence
 1948: Corteira
 1949: Coronation / Galgala *
 1950: Corejada
 1951: Djelfa
 1952: Pomare
 1953: Hurnli
 1954: Virgule
 1955: Dictaway
 1956: Apollonia
 1957: Toro
 1958: Yla
 1959: Ginetta
 1960: Timandra
 1961: Solitude
 1962: La Sega
 1963: Altissima
 1964: Rajput Princess
 1965: La Sarre
 1966: Right Away
 1967: Gazala
 1968: Pola Bella
 1969: Koblenza

* The 1949 race was a dead-heat and has joint winners.

See also
 List of French flat horse races

References

 France Galop / Racing Post:
 galop.courses-france.com:
 1883–1889, 1890–1919, 1920–1949, 1950–1979, 1980–present

 france-galop.com – A Brief History: Poule d'Essai des Pouliches.
 galopp-sieger.de – Poule d'Essai des Pouliches.
 horseracingintfed.com – International Federation of Horseracing Authorities – Poule d'Essai des Pouliches (2017).
 pedigreequery.com – Poule d'Essai des Pouliches – Longchamp.
 tbheritage.com – Poule d'Essai des Pouliches.

Flat horse races for three-year-old fillies
Longchamp Racecourse
Horse races in France
1883 establishments in France
Recurring sporting events established in 1883